Pilag may refer to:

 Piłąg, Poland
 Pilehgah, Iran